Orion may refer to:

Common meanings 
 Orion (constellation), named after the mythical hunter
 Orion (mythology), a hunter in Greek mythology
 Orion (spacecraft), NASA crew vehicle first launched in 2022

Arts and media

Fictional entities

Characters and species 
 Orion (character), a DC Comics character
 Orion (Star Trek), a sentient alien species
 Orion, code name of Stephen J. Bartowski on the television show Chuck
 Orion, in the fighting game Brawlhalla
 Orions, a race in the Starfire board game and book series
 Orion, a character from Power Rangers Super Megaforce
 Captain Orion, in the Japanese series X-Bomber

Vessels 
 Orion, a spaceplane in the film 2001: A Space Odyssey
 Orion, a spaceship in Raumpatrouille Orion (Space Patrol Orion in English), the first German science fiction television series
 "Orion"-class spaceship, on the television series Ascension

Literature 

 Orion, an 1843 poem by Richard Henry Horne
 Orion, a 1978 novel by Gail Brewer-Giorgio
 Orion and King Arthur, a 2012 novel series by Ben Bova
 The Orion, an 1893 book on sociology by Bal Gangadhar Tilak
 Dead at Daybreak, a 1998 novel by Deon Meyer, originally published as Orion

Music

Albums and long-form compositions 
 Orion (Ryan Adams album)
 Orion (X Ambassadors album)
 Orion, a 1979 orchestral work by Claude Vivier
 Orion (Lacoste), an opera by the French composer Louis Lacoste
 Orion, a 2004 Philip Glass composition
 Orion, an album by the band she
 Orion & Pleiades (1984), a symphonic work by Toru Takemitsu

Songs 
 "Orion" (Girl Next Door song)
 "Orion" (Mika Nakashima song)
 "Orion", a song by 12012
 "Orion", a song in the boxed set Dead Can Dance (1981–1998)  by Dead Can Dance
 "Orion", a song on the album Stormwatch by Jethro Tull
 "Orion", an instrumental piece on the album Master of Puppets by Metallica
 "Orion", a 2017 non-album single by Kenshi Yonezu

Other uses in music 
 Orion Records (1960s–'80s), a classical record label
 Jimmy "Orion" Ellis, American singer

Periodicals
 Orion (manga), by Masamune Shirow
 Orion (magazine), a magazine on nature, environment and culture
 ORiON, the journal of the Operations Research Society of South Africa
 Ginga Densetsu Weed: Orion, a manga by Yoshihiro Takahashi
 The Orion (California State University, Chico), a student newspaper

Other uses in arts and media
 Orion (film), a Canadian film
 Orion (sculpture), work by Mark di Suvero
 Miss Riboet's Orion (1925–42), a theatrical troupe active in the Dutch East Indies

Buildings 
 The Orion (skyscraper) in New York City
 Orion Assembly, a General Motors assembly plant in Orion Township, Michigan
 Orion Building, a residential building in Birmingham, England
 Orion, the movie theater of Finland's National Audiovisual Archive
 Orion Theatre, largest avant-garde theatrical/artist stage in Stockholm, Sweden
 Orion Mall, Bangalore, India; a shopping mall

Companies

Arts and media
 Orion Pictures, an American film production company, now a subsidiary of MGM
 Orion Publishing Group, a UK-based book publisher
 Orion Records (1960s–'80s), a classical record label

Electrical power and electronics
 Orion Electric, a Japanese electronics company
 Orion Electronics, a Hungarian company
 Orion Energy Systems, an American power technology company
 Orion New Zealand Limited, a New Zealand electricity distribution company

Food and beverage
 Orion Breweries, the fifth-largest beer brewery in Japan
 Orion Confectionery, a South Korean confectionery company

Transportation and vehicles

Transport carriers
 Orion Airways, a UK airline that operated from 1979 to 1989
 Orion Air, a Seychelles airline
 Orion Expedition Cruises, an Australian cruise line
 Orionair, a Spanish charter airline
 Orionair, name used by Luxembourg airline Lionair when operating flights to the United States

Vehicle manufacturers
 Orion Bus Industries, a Canadian bus manufacturer
 Orion Space, a Nepalese company producing the Nepal PQ-1 picosatellite
 Orionette, also known as Orion AG für Motorfahrzeuge, a German motorcycle manufacturer

Other companies
 Orion Telescopes & Binoculars, an American company
 Orion Corporation, a Finnish pharmaceutical company

People 
 Orion (name)
 Orion, industry name of record producer Darren Tate (born 1972)
 Orion, stage name of Tomasz Wróblewski (born 1980), Polish musician
 Jimmy "Orion" Ellis (1945–1998), American rockabilly singer

Places

United States 
 Orion, Alabama, an unincorporated community
 Orion, Illinois, a village
 Orion Township, Fulton County, Illinois
 Orion High School, in Orion, Illinois
 Orion, Wisconsin, a town
 Orion (community), Wisconsin, an unincorporated community
 Orion Township, Michigan
 Orion Township, Minnesota

Elsewhere 
 Orion, Alberta, Canada, a hamlet
 Orion, Bataan, the Philippines, a municipality
 Orion, Pyrénées-Atlantiques, France, a commune
 Orion, Queensland, Australia, a village in the Central Highlands Region
 Orion Passage, a narrow sailing route on the northwestern tip of Antarctica

Science and technology

Astronomy
 Orion (constellation), named after the mythical hunter
 Orion Arm, a galactic spiral arm with apparent location near the constellation
 Orion Nebula, in the constellation

Biology
 Orion (beetle), a genus of beetles
 Orion (grape), a white wine grape variety
 Historis odius, the Orion, a butterfly in the genus Historis

Computing
ORION (research and education network), the provincial research network of Ontario, Canada
 Orion (system-on-a-chip), used in network-attached storage
 Ferranti Orion, a mid-range mainframe computer introduced in 1959
 HLH Orion, a series of minicomputers produced in the 1980s
 Orion Application Server, a Java EE application server
 Orion quantum computing system, developed by D-Wave Systems
 Orion, a browser-based IDE and open tool integration platform from Eclipse
 Orion, IT admin software by SolarWinds

Other technologies
 Orion (laser), a large laser installation in the UK
Orion (space telescope), two research instruments on crewed 1970s Soviet spacecraft

Sports

Football (soccer) 
 A.D. Orión, a Panamanian football club
 Orión F.C., a Costa Rican football club
 Orion F.C., a Scottish football club

Other sports
 Goyang Orion Orions, a South Korean basketball team
 Orions, former name of the Chiba Lotte Marines, a Japanese baseball team

Transportation and military

Air 
 Lockheed P-3 Orion, a maritime patrol aircraft, with several variants
 Lockheed Model 9 Orion, a passenger aircraft introduced in 1931
 Aurora Flight Sciences Orion, a long-endurance uncrewed aircraft
 Bristol Orion, a cancelled two-shaft turboprop aero engine developed by Bristol Siddeley
 Kronshtadt Orion, Russian UCAV drone

Land 
 Ford Orion, a car
 Orion, a South Devon Railway Comet-class steam locomotive
 Orion, a GWR 3300-class steam locomotive
 Mitsubishi Orion engine, a series of internal combustion engines produced by Mitsubishi Motors

Sea

Military vessels 
 , several U.S. Navy vessels
 , several Royal Navy vessels
 , a series of super-dreadnoughts of the Royal Navy
 , an Oberon-class of the Royal Australian Navy
 , a Swedish ELINT vessel
 , a Téméraire-class of the French Navy
 , World War II merchant raider
 BAE Orion (H-101), Ecuadorian Navy ship, originally 
 NRP Oríon (P1156), a Portuguese Navy

Other vessels
 , a ship which sank off Portpatrick, Scotland in 1850
 , a cruise ship
 , an ocean liner of the Orient Steam Navigation Company
 , a Swedish steel steamship decommissioned in 1979, now a museum ship
 Orion 50, an American sailboat design
 Orion (ship, 1904), built as a whale-catcher, she later served as a fireboat in Vancouver

Space

Rockets
 Orion (rocket), a US sounding rocket
 Orión (rocket), an Argentine sounding rocket
 Orion (rocket stage), a series of rocket motors used in the Pegasus rockets
 Project Orion (nuclear propulsion), a 1958 US nuclear pulse propulsion study project

Space vehicles 
 Orion (spacecraft), NASA crew vehicle first flown in 2022
 Orion (space telescope), two instruments flown aboard Soviet spacecraft
 Orion, the Lunar Module used in the Apollo 16 mission
 Orion (satellite), a series of reconnaissance satellites
 A series of satellites operated by Orion Network Systems, now part of Telesat
 Orion 3, an off-course communication satellite (1999)

Other uses 
 Orion (dog), a rescue dog
 Orion (roller coaster), a steel roller coaster at Kings Island, in Mason, Ohio, US
 Orion, the flagship wine of American winemaker Sean Thackrey
 Our Race is Our Nation, a slogan used by the Ku Klux Klan and other white nationalists

See also 
 Arion (disambiguation)
 EURion constellation, anti-counterfeiting patterns integrated into various kinds of currency
 Exercise Orion (disambiguation)
 Orione (opera) (1653), by Francesco Cavalli
 O'Ryan
 Orion 1 (disambiguation)
 Orion 2 (disambiguation)
 Orion the Hunter (disambiguation)
 Project Orion (disambiguation)